The following is a list of people executed by the U.S. state of Montana since capital punishment was resumed in 1976.

A total of 3 people convicted of murder have been executed since the Gregg v. Georgia decision. They were all executed by lethal injection. Terry Langford and David Dawson waived their appeals and asked that their executions be carried out.

See also 
 Capital punishment in Montana
 Capital punishment in the United States
 Barry Beach

References

 
Montana
People executed